{{Infobox comics set and title
| title               = Iron Man
| image               = Ironman001.jpg
| caption             = Iron Man #1 (May 1968)Cover art by Gene Colan and Mike Esposito
| alt                 = 
| schedule            = Monthly
| ongoing             = Y
| genre               = Superhero
| publisher           = Marvel Comics
|1stishhead = vol. 1
|1stishyr = 1968
|1stishmo = May
|endishyr = 1996
|endishmo = September
|1stishhead1 = vol. 2
|1stishyr1 = 1996
|1stishmo1 = November
|endishyr1 = 1997
|endishmo1 = November
|1stishhead2 = vol. 3
|1stishyr2 = 1998
|1stishmo2 = February
|endishyr2 = 2004
|endishmo2 = December
|1stishhead3 = vol. 4
|1stishyr3 = 2005
|1stishmo3 = January
|endishyr3 = 2009
|endishmo3 = January
|1stishhead4 = Invincible Iron Man (vol. 1)
|1stishyr4 = 2008
|1stishmo4 = July
|endishyr4 = 2011
|endishmo4 = February
|1stishhead5 = vol. 1 cont.
|1stishyr5 = 2011
|1stishmo5 = March
|endishyr5 = 2012
|endishmo5 = December
|1stishhead6 = vol. 5
|1stishyr6 = 2013
|1stishmo6 = January
|endishyr6 = 2014
|endishmo6 = August
|1stishhead7 = Superior Iron Man
|1stishyr7 = 2015
|1stishmo7 = January
|endishyr7 = 2015
|endishmo7 = August
|1stishhead8 = Invincible Iron Man (vol. 2)
|1stishyr8 = 2015
|1stishmo8 = December
| issues              = (vol. 1): 332 (#1–332)(vol. 2): 13 (#1–13)(vol. 3): 89 (#1–89)(vol. 4): 35 (#1–35)(vol. 1) cont.: 29 (#500–527 plus #500.1)(vol. 5): 29 (#1–28 plus #20.INH)(vol. 6): 21 (#1–21) (as of September 2022 cover date)(Infamous Iron Man (vol. 1)): 12 (#1–12)(Invincible Iron Man (vol. 1)): 33 (#1–33)(Invincible Iron Man (vol. 2)): 14 (#1–14)(Invincible Iron Man (vol. 3)): 14 (#1–14)(Invincible Iron Man (vol. 4)): 11 (#1–11)(Superior Iron Man): 9 (#1–9)(Tony Stark: Iron Man): 11 (#1–11)
| main_char_team      = Iron Man
| issn                = 
| writers             = {{List collapsed|(vol. 1)Archie Goodwin (1–28, 88–90), Mimi Gold (29), Allyn Brodsky (30–34, 38), Gerry Conway (35–43, 91–97), Robert Kanigher (44), Gary Friderich (45–46, 60, 70), Roy Thomas (44, 47), Mike Friedrich (48–55, 58–75, 77, 79–81), Steve Gerber (56–58), Bill Mantlo (78, 86–87, 95–115, Annual #4), David Michelinie (116–157, 215–250, Annual #9–10), Dennis O'Neil (158, 160–208), Dennis Mallonee (209), Danny Fingeroth (202, 210–214, 253), Bob Layton (116–117, 119–120, 123, 125, 127–133, 135, 137–153, 215–250, 254, 256), Randall Frenz (257), John Byrne (258–277), Len Kaminski (278–318), Terry Kavanagh (319–332)(vol. 2)Jim Lee (1–5 (w/ Scott Lobdell), 7, 11–12), Jeph Loeb (7–12)(vol. 3)Kurt Busiek (1–25, Annual 1999), Roger Stern (14–25), Joe Quesada (26–35, Annual 2000, #1/2), Mike Grell (50–66), Frank Tieri (31–35, 37–49, Annual 2001), John Jackson Miller (73–85), Mark Scott Ricketts (86–89)(vol. 4)Warren Ellis (1–6), Charles Knauf(Invincible Iron Man (vol. 1))Matt Fraction(vol. 5)Kieron Gillen}}
| artists             = 
| pencillers          = {{List collapsed|(vol. 1)Gene Colan, Johnny Craig, George Tuska, John Romita Jr., Bob Layton, Paul Ryan(vol. 2)Whilce Portacio, Ed Benes, Terry Shoemaker(vol. 3)Patrick Zircher, Sean Chen, Mike Grell(vol. 4)Adi Granov, Roberto De la Torre, Carlo Pagulayan(Invincible Iron Man (vol. 1))Salvador Larroca(vol. 1) cont.Salvador Larroca(vol. 5)Greg Land}}
| inkers              = 
| letterers           = 
| colorists           = 
| editors             = 
| creative_team_month = 
| creative_team_year  = 
| creators            = 
| CEheader            = 
| TPB                 = 
| ISBN                = 
| subcat              = 
| altcat              = 
| sort                = 
| addpubcat1          = 
| nonUS               = 
}}Iron Man is the name of several comic book titles featuring the character Iron Man and published by Marvel Comics, beginning with the original Iron Man series that debuted in 1968.

Publication history

Volume 1
The character made his first appearance in Tales of Suspense #39 (cover dated March 1963). After issue #99 (March 1968), the Tales of Suspense series was renamed Captain America. An Iron Man story appeared in the one-shot issue Iron Man and Sub-Mariner #1 (April 1968), before the "Golden Avenger" made his solo debut with Iron Man #1 (May 1968). The series' indicia gives its copyright title as Iron Man, while the trademarked cover logo of most issues is The Invincible Iron Man. Artist George Tuska began a decade-long association with the character with Iron Man #5 (Sept. 1968). Writer Mike Friedrich and artist Jim Starlin's brief collaboration on the Iron Man series introduced Mentor, Drax, Starfox, and Thanos in issue #55 (Feb. 1973). Friedrich scripted a metafictional story in which Iron Man visited the San Diego Comic Convention and met several Marvel Comics writers and artists. He then wrote the multi-issue "War of the Super-Villains" storyline which ran through 1975.

Writer David Michelinie, co-plotter/inker Bob Layton, and penciler John Romita Jr. became the creative team on the series with Iron Man #116 (Nov. 1978).  Micheline and Layton established Tony Stark's alcoholism with the story "Demon in a Bottle", and introduced several supporting characters, including Stark's bodyguard/girlfriend Bethany Cabe; Stark's personal pilot and confidant James Rhodes, who later became the superhero War Machine; and rival industrialist Justin Hammer, who was revealed to be the employer of numerous high-tech armed enemies Iron Man had fought over the years. The duo also introduced the concept of Stark's specialized armors as he acquired a dangerous vendetta with Doctor Doom in the "Doomquest" storyline. The team worked together through #154 (Jan. 1982), with Michelinie writing three issues without Layton.

Following Michelinie and Layton's departures, Dennis O'Neil became the new writer of the series and had Stark relapse into alcoholism. Much of O'Neil's work on this plot thread was based on experiences with alcoholics he knew personally. Jim Rhodes replaced Stark as Iron Man in issue #169 (April 1983) and wore the armor for the next two years of stories. O'Neil returned Tony Stark to the Iron Man identity in issue #200 (Nov. 1985). Michelinie and Layton became the creative team once again in issue #215 (Feb. 1987). They crafted the "Armor Wars" storyline in issues #225 (Dec. 1987) to #231 (June 1988).  John Byrne and John Romita Jr. produced a sequel titled "Armor Wars II" in issues #258-266 (July 1990-March 1991). The series had a crossover with the other Avengers-related titles as part of the "Operation: Galactic Storm" storyline. This initial series ended with issue #332 (Sept. 1996).

Volume 2
Jim Lee, Scott Lobdell, and Jeph Loeb authored a second volume of the series as part of Heroes Reborn, which was drawn primarily by Whilce Portacio and Ryan Benjamin. This volume took place in a parallel universe and ran 13 issues (Nov. 1996 – Nov. 1997).

Volume 3
Volume 3, whose first 25 issues were written by Kurt Busiek and then by Busiek and Roger Stern, ran 89 issues (Feb. 1998 - Dec. 2004). Later writers included Joe Quesada, Frank Tieri, Mike Grell, and John Jackson Miller. Issue #41 (June 2001) was additionally numbered #386, reflecting the start of dual numbering starting from the premiere issue of Volume 1 in 1968. The final issue was dual-numbered as #434.

Volume 4

The next Iron Man series, Iron Man (vol. 4), debuted in early 2005 with the Warren Ellis-written storyline "Extremis", with artist Adi Granov. It ran 35 issues (Jan. 2005 - Jan. 2009), with the cover logo simply Iron Man, beginning with issue #13, and Iron Man: Director of S.H.I.E.L.D., beginning with issue #15. On the final three issues, the cover logo was overwritten by "War Machine, Weapon of S.H.I.E.L.D.", which led to the launch of a War Machine ongoing series.

The Invincible Iron Man (vol. 1), by writer Matt Fraction and artist Salvador Larroca, began with a premiere issue cover dated July 2008. For a seven-month overlap, Marvel published both Volume 4 and Volume 5 simultaneously. This Invincible volume jumped its numbering of issues from #33 to #500, cover-dated March 2011, to reflect the start from the premiere issue of Volume 1 in 1968.

Volume 5
After the conclusion of The Invincible Iron Man (vol. 1), a new Iron Man series was started as a part of Marvel NOW!. Written by Kieron Gillen and illustrated by Greg Land, it began with issue #1 in November 2012, and ended with issue #28 in June 2014. The fifth volume consists of the "Iron Metropolitan" and "Rings of the Mandarin" story arcs. The volume also revealed that Tony was adopted, and that he had a disabled half-brother named Arno.

Collected editions

Marvel Masterworks: Iron Man

Essential Iron Man

Iron Man Epic Collections

Iron Man Omnibus

Iron Man

Heroes Reborn/Heroes Return

Iron Man (vol. 4)/Invincible Iron Man (vol. 1)

Marvel NOW!

Miniseries

See also
 Infamous Iron Man

References

External links
 Iron Man at Cover Browser

1968 comics debuts
Comics by Archie Goodwin (comics)
Comics by David Michelinie
Comics by Dennis O'Neil
Comics by Gerry Conway
Comics by John Byrne (comics)
Comics by Len Wein
Comics by Roger Stern
Comics by Roy Thomas
Iron Man
Marvel Comics titles